Dhanraj Baid Jain College, is a general degree college located at Jyothi Nagar, Chennai, Tamil Nadu. It was established in the year 1972. The college is affiliated with University of Madras. This college offers different courses in arts, commerce and science.

Departments

Science

Mathematics
Computer Science
BCA

Arts and Commerce

Tamil
English
Economics
Commerce
Management

Accreditation
The college is  recognized by the University Grants Commission (UGC).

Notable alumni
Vijay Sethupathi, actor, writer, producer
Metro Priya, first Compere in tamil t.v (D.D) Metro Chennai.

See also
Education in India
Literacy in India
List of institutions of higher education in Tamil Nadu

References

External links
http://dbjaincollege.org/

Educational institutions established in 1972
1972 establishments in Tamil Nadu
Colleges affiliated to University of Madras
Universities and colleges in Chennai